Rostislav Pohlmann is a Paralympian athlete from the Czech Republic competing mainly in category F57 throwing events.

Pohlmann has competed at four Paralympics winning at least one medal at each games.  He first competed in Atlanta in the 1996 Summer Paralympics where he competed in the discus, javelin and shot put in the F56 class winning the silver medal in the javelin.  Four years later in Sydney at the 2000 Summer Paralympics he again competed in the three throwing events, this time in the F57 category,  and won another silver medal in the javelin.  In the 2000 Summer Paralympics in Athens he competed in the F57 category in the  shot put and won a bronze medal in the javelin and a gold in the discus.  In his fourth games in Beijing he won two bronze medals in the F57/58 discus and javelin having not competed in the shot put.

External links
 

Paralympic athletes of the Czech Republic
Athletes (track and field) at the 1996 Summer Paralympics
Athletes (track and field) at the 2000 Summer Paralympics
Athletes (track and field) at the 2004 Summer Paralympics
Athletes (track and field) at the 2008 Summer Paralympics
Paralympic gold medalists for the Czech Republic
Paralympic silver medalists for the Czech Republic
Paralympic bronze medalists for the Czech Republic
Living people
Medalists at the 1996 Summer Paralympics
Medalists at the 2000 Summer Paralympics
Medalists at the 2004 Summer Paralympics
Medalists at the 2008 Summer Paralympics
Year of birth missing (living people)
Paralympic medalists in athletics (track and field)
Czech male discus throwers
Czech male javelin throwers
Wheelchair discus throwers
Wheelchair javelin throwers
Paralympic discus throwers
Paralympic javelin throwers